Forty Hearts is a 1931 Soviet drama film directed by Lev Kuleshov

Plot 
The film tells about forty district power stations under construction, which are expected to give energy to the Soviet Union.

References

External links 

1931 films
1930s Russian-language films
Soviet black-and-white films
Soviet drama films
1931 drama films